The Eastern Intercollegiate Gymnastics League (EIGL) is an NCAA Division I college athletic conference which sponsors men’s gymnastics. It is an affiliate of the Eastern College Athletic Conference (ECAC).

Members
See footnote
Army Black Knights
Navy Midshipmen
Simpson Storm
Springfield Pride
William & Mary Tribe

Championships

See footnotes

See also

NCAA Men's Gymnastics Championships
East Atlantic Gymnastics League (women)
List of gymnastics terms

Footnotes

External links
Eastern Intercollegiate Gymnastics League home page (Eastern College Athletic Conference official website). Retrieved 2010-02-27.

NCAA Division I conferences
College gymnastics by conference in the United States